The 1998 ICF Canoe Sprint World Championships were held in Szeged, Hungary.

The men's competition consisted of nine Canadian (single paddle, open boat) and nine kayak events. Women competed in eight events, all in kayak.

This was the 29th championships in canoe sprint.

Medal summary

Men's

Canoe

Kayak

Women's

Kayak

Medal table

References
ICF medalists for Olympic and World Championships - Part 1: flatwater (now sprint): 1936-2007.
ICF medalists for Olympic and World Championships - Part 2: rest of flatwater (now sprint) and remaining canoeing disciplines: 1936-2007.

Icf Canoe Sprint World Championships, 1998
Icf Canoe Sprint World Championships, 1998
ICF Canoe Sprint World Championships
International sports competitions hosted by Hungary
Canoeing in Hungary